Aycrigg Mansion, located in Passaic, Passaic County, New Jersey, United States, was the home of John Bancker Aycrigg. The mansion was built in 1848 and was added to the National Register of Historic Places on April 29, 1982, for its significance in architecture, education, politics/government, and social history.

History
In 1848, Dr. John Bancker Aycrigg, a physician and politician who represented New Jersey in the United States House of Representatives, built the Renaissance revival Italian Palazzo style home for his family.  One of Aycrigg's sons, Benjamin Bogert Aycrigg, was the first mayor of Passaic, in 1873 and later owned the mansion.

In 1899, the house became the first permanent home of the Passaic Collegiate School (which today is at 22 Kent Court). In 1908, the house became the new home of several Masonic lodges, which it remained until 1994. For a several years, the house was the home to the Passaic Museum which shut down due to financial issues.

Since the late 1990s, the structure houses a boy's religious high school, Mesivta Tiferes R' Tzvi Aryeh Zemel.

Gallery

See also
National Register of Historic Places listings in Passaic County, New Jersey

References

External links
 

Houses on the National Register of Historic Places in New Jersey
Renaissance Revival architecture in New Jersey
Houses completed in 1848
Houses in Passaic County, New Jersey
Buildings and structures in Passaic, New Jersey
National Register of Historic Places in Passaic County, New Jersey
New Jersey Register of Historic Places
Historic American Buildings Survey in New Jersey